Gallagher may refer to:

Places

United States
 Gallagher Township, Pennsylvania
 Gallagher, West Virginia, an unincorporated place

People
 Gallagher (surname)

Fictional characters
Mary Katherine Gallagher, fictional Saturday Night Live character
The Gallagher family, from Shameless

Other
 Arthur J. Gallagher & Co., American insurance brokerage
 The Gallagher Index, in political science
 The Gallagher Group (UK), construction and quarrying firm
 "Gallagher" (Space Ghost Coast to Coast), a television episode

See also
Gallager (disambiguation)
Gallaher (disambiguation)
Gallacher
Goligher
Justice Gallagher (disambiguation)